Elmer S. Gish School (formally known as Elmer S. Gish Elementary/Junior High School), part of St. Albert Public Schools, is an Elementary-Junior High school located in St. Albert, Alberta, Canada. The school has been in operation since 1981 and was named after a St. Albert educator.

The school is a double-track school, offering Kindergarten to Grade 9 in the Global and Cogito programs. The current principal is John Strembitski and the Assistant Principals are Derek Harrison and Sue Werner.

Awards 
Elmer S Gish School is notable in that, in August 2010, Kindergarten teacher Derek Harrison was honored as one of the top three teachers in Canada by Canadian Family Magazine.

References 

Educational institutions established in 1981
Elementary schools in Alberta
Middle schools in Alberta
Schools in St. Albert, Alberta
1981 establishments in Alberta